Christian Rutjens Oliva (born 5 January 1998) is a Spanish professional footballer who plays as a defender for Italian  club Foggia.

Career
In 2016, Rutjens signed for Italian Serie A side Benevento, where he made one league appearance. On 20 May 2018, he debuted for Benevento in a 1–0 loss to Chievo. Before the second half of 2018–19, Rutjens signed for Cesena in the Italian fourth division. In 2021, he signed for Maltese club Floriana.

On 6 January 2023, Rutjens returned to Italy and signed with Foggia until the end of the season, with an option to renew.

References

External links

Living people
1998 births
Spanish people of Dutch descent
Spanish footballers
Association football defenders
Serie A players
Serie D players
Maltese Premier League players
Benevento Calcio players
Cesena F.C. players
Floriana F.C. players
U.S.D. Recanatese 1923 players
S.E.F. Torres 1903 players
Calcio Foggia 1920 players
Spanish expatriate footballers
Spanish expatriate sportspeople in Italy
Expatriate footballers in Italy
Spanish expatriate sportspeople in Malta
Expatriate footballers in Malta